The Gravensteen (Dutch; literally "Castle of the Counts") is a medieval castle at Ghent, East Flanders in Belgium. The current castle dates from 1180 and was the residence of the Counts of Flanders until 1353. It was subsequently re-purposed as a court, prison, mint, and even as a cotton factory. It was restored over 1893–1903 and is now a museum and a major landmark in the city.

Origins
The origins of the Gravensteen date to the reign of Arnulf I (890–965). The site, which sat between two branches of the river Lys, was first fortified around 1000, initially in wood and later in stone. This was soon transformed into a motte-and-bailey castle which burnt down in around 1176.

The current castle dates to 1180 and was built by Philip of Alsace (1143–1191) on the site of the older fortification. It may have been inspired by crusader castles witnessed by Philip during the Second Crusade. As well a protective citadel, the Gravensteen was intended to intimidate the burghers of Ghent who often challenged the counts' authority. It incorporates a large central donjon, a residence and various smaller buildings. These are surrounded by a fortified, oval-shaped enceinte lined with 24 small échauguettes. It also has a sizeable moat, fed with water from the Lys.

From 1180 until 1353, the Gravensteen was the residence of the Counts of Flanders. The decision to leave was taken by Louis of Male (1330–1384) who transferred the court to the nearby Hof ten Walle.

Subsequent history
After ceasing to be the residence of the counts of Flanders, the castle entered a decline. It was used as a court and prison until the 18th century. From 1353 to 1491, it was the site of Ghent's mint and private buildings were later constructed on or around the Medieval remains. During the Industrial Revolution, the Gravensteen was converted into a cotton mill by an industrialist who purchased the site. It was even scheduled for demolition.

Parts of the castle were bought up gradually by the City of Ghent which began a major restoration in a romanticising Gothic style between 1893 and 1907 under the architect Joseph de Waele. De Waele was inspired the approach of the French architect Eugène Viollet-le-Duc and attempted to restore the castle to its imagined appearance in the 12th century. Many details added during this period, such as the flat roofs and the windows of the eastern outbuilding, are not thought to be historically accurate.

The Gravensteen was the centrepiece of the Ghent World Fair of 1913 during which the city centre was significantly reshaped. It remains open to the public.

See also
List of castles in Belgium

References

External links

Official website
Castle of the Counts at Visit Ghent
Gravensteen at Inventaris Onroerende Erfgoed

Castles in Belgium
Castles in East Flanders
Buildings and structures in Ghent
Buildings and structures completed in 1180
Museums in Ghent
Historic house museums in Belgium
Tourist attractions in Ghent